Paul Clemente (born May 19, 1963) is an American politician who served in the Michigan House of Representatives from 2011 to 2016. He represented the 14th district which includes Lincoln Park, Riverview, Melvindale and Wyandotte in the Downriver section of Wayne County.

Early life
Clements is a lifelong resident of the district where his parents owned and operated Clemente's Bar, Restaurant and Bowling Alley. It closed in 2010 after 60 years in business. By that time, Clemente was a co-owner and manager.

Career 
Prior to being elected, Clemente was an accountant at Coopers & Lybrand.

Personal life
Clemente's wife is Cara Clemente, who became a politician. They have three children. Clemente lives in Lincoln Park, Michigan.

References

1963 births
Living people
Democratic Party members of the Michigan House of Representatives
People from Lincoln Park, Michigan
American accountants
21st-century American politicians